Cividini is an Italian fashion house known for producing luxury cashmere knitwear, founded in 1988 by the idea of Piero Cividini and his wife Miriam Cividini.

History 
At the launch of the first collection of Pret-a-porter during the Milan Fashion Week in 1995, they were the first to show knitwear and woven garments made of silk-steel fabric, material that, together with the different special finishing techniques (inkjet printing, tie-dye, screen printing, pigment printing, printing for corrosion, dyeing and hand-painted) defined the unique hand craftmanship of the Italian brand. These techniques and materials have become common over the years, but at the time were experimental.

References 

Clothing companies established in 1988
Italian  companies established in 1988
Clothing brands of Italy
Luxury brands
High fashion brands
Fashion accessory brands